Jim Mahnic is a former member of the Ohio House of Representatives. He also works in the tool and dye industry.

References

Democratic Party members of the Ohio House of Representatives
Living people
Year of birth missing (living people)